Saurabh Durgesh is a Chillout/Electronica/Pop Music Producer duo composed of Saurabh Shetye and Durgesh Khot hailing from Mumbai, India.

Musical career 

Saurabh and Durgesh defined their musical tenacity with the release of their music video Aag Ka Gola L.A., an International Collaboration with the Step-Up 2 Famed Hollywood Actor Robert Hoffman. They were long-time friends, and having completed Engineering, shifted into the Music Field. They had been performing live for a couple of years from 2011-2014 with the band Indo Gypsies before moving on to the film industry as music directors. The duo has composed music in multiple films including Pappu Ki Pugdandi(2015), Amrita And I(2016), Anaan(2017) and Maza Algaar(2017). They are also behind the music for a variety of TV Commercials for brand campaigns like Jeep Compass, Kelloggs and Eva among others. Saurabh - Durgesh perform their originals in a unique EDM act laced with Live Vocals, Instruments and Samples which gives an edge in the traditional DJ Space as well.

Music Singles 

Saurabh - Durgesh have composed, arranged and produced these songs as single releases.

Discography - Movies

Awards

References

External links
 www.SaurabhDurgeshMusic.com

Indian male singer-songwriters
Indian singer-songwriters
Bollywood playback singers
Indian musical duos
Singers from Mumbai